Geaya is a genus of harvestmen in the family Sclerosomatidae from Latin America.

Species
 Geaya aenescens Roewer, 1910
 Geaya areolata Roewer, 1953
 Geaya atrolutea Roewer, 1910
 Geaya atrospinulosa Roewer, 1957
 Geaya aureobrunnea Roewer, 1953
 Geaya aureolucens Roewer, 1953
 Geaya auriscutata Roewer, 1963
 Geaya auroephippiata Roewer, 1956
 Geaya auruginia C.J.Goodnight & M.L.Goodnight, 1942
 Geaya bahiensis Mello-Leitão, 1931
 Geaya belizensis C.J.Goodnight & M.L.Goodnight, 1947
 Geaya benedictina Roewer, 1953
 Geaya bimaculata Caporiacco, 1938
 Geaya bipectinata Roewer, 1953
 Geaya boliviana Roewer, 1953
 Geaya brevipes Roewer, 1915
 Geaya brunea Mello-Leitão, 1941
 Geaya caraca C.J.Goodnight & M.L.Goodnight, 1947
 Geaya centralis Roewer, 1953
 Geaya chamberlini Roewer, 1953
 Geaya corneli Roewer, 1953
 Geaya coxalis Roewer, 1953
 Geaya crucicolorata Roewer, 1953
 Geaya cuprinites Roewer, 1957
 Geaya davisi C.J.Goodnight & M.L.Goodnight, 1942
 Geaya decorata Roewer, 1953
 Geaya elegans Roewer, 1927c
 Geaya ephippiata Roewer, 1915
 Geaya esperanza C.J.Goodnight & M.L.Goodnight, 1942
 Geaya exlineae Roewer, 1953
 Geaya fasciata Roewer, 1953
 Geaya femoralis Roewer, 1953
 Geaya funerea Caporiacco, 1951
 Geaya gertschi Roewer, 1953
 Geaya goodnighti Roewer, 1953
 Geaya grandis Roewer, 1953
 Geaya haitiensis C.J.Goodnight & M.L.Goodnight, 1943
 Geaya ibarrana Roewer, 1953
 Geaya illudens Mello-Leitão, 1947
 Geaya insularis Roewer, 1953
 Geaya jamaicana Roewer, 1953
 Geaya lineata C.J.Goodnight & M.L.Goodnight, 1953
 Geaya maculatipes Roewer, 1916
 Geaya magna Roewer, 1953
 Geaya marginata Roewer, 1953
 Geaya mediana Roewer, 1953
 Geaya monticola 
 Geaya nigricoxa Roewer, 1910
 Geaya nigriventis Mello-Leitão, 1942
 Geaya nigromaculata Roewer, 1910
 Geaya nigrosigillata Mello-Leitão, 1947
 Geaya opaca Roewer, 1953
 Geaya ortizi Roewer, 1957
 Geaya parallela Roewer, 1953
 Geaya plana C.J.Goodnight & M.L.Goodnight, 1942
 Geaya plaumanni Roewer, 1953
 Geaya pulchra Roewer, 1953
 Geaya punctulata Roewer, 1953
 Geaya quadrimaculata Roewer, 1953
 Geaya recifea Roewer, 1953
 Geaya reimoseri Roewer, 1933
 Geaya sandersoni C.J.Goodnight & M.L.Goodnight, 1947
 Geaya scrobiculata Roewer, 1953
 Geaya speciosa Roewer, 1953
 Geaya splendens Roewer, 1953
 Geaya striata Roewer, 1953
 Geaya tampicona Roewer, 1953
 Geaya tezonapa C.J.Goodnight & M.L.Goodnight, 1947
 Geaya thoracica Roewer, 1953
 Geaya tibialis Roewer, 1953
 Geaya unicolor Roewer, 1910
 Geaya ventralis Roewer, 1953
 Geaya viridinitens Roewer, 1953
 Geaya vivida C.J.Goodnight & M.L.Goodnight, 1942
 Geaya vogli C.J.Goodnight & M.L.Goodnight, 1947
 Geaya wenzeli C.J.Goodnight & M.L.Goodnight, 1947
 Geaya werneri Roewer, 1953
 Geaya yucatana C.J.Goodnight & M.L.Goodnight, 1947

References

Harvestmen
Harvestman genera